Bestâmi Yazgan (born 1957, in Osmaniye, Turkey) is a Turkish composer. He graduated from Atatürk University, School of Literature in 1978. Currently, he teaches literature at Istanbul Vefa High School in addition to working as editor in chief of the periodical Güneysu Kültür, Sanat ve Edebiyat Dergisi that has been published in Osmaniye for 16 years.

See also 
 List of composers of classical Turkish music

References

Turkish composers
Composers of Ottoman classical music
Composers of Turkish makam music
1957 births
Living people
People from Osmaniye